Chaim Grade (April 4, 1910 – June 26, 1982) was one of the leading Yiddish writers of the twentieth century.

Grade was born in Vilnius, Russian Empire and died in The Bronx, New York. He is buried in Riverside Cemetery, Saddle Brook, New Jersey.

Grade was raised Orthodox-leaning, and he studied in yeshiva as a teenager, but ended up with a secular outlook, in part due to his poetic ambitions.  Losing his family in the Holocaust, he resettled in New York, and increasingly took to fiction, writing in Yiddish. Initially he was reluctant to have his work translated.

He was praised by Elie Wiesel as "one of the great—if not the greatest—of living Yiddish novelists." In 1970 he won the Itzik Manger Prize for contributions to Yiddish letters.

Life
Chaim Grade, the son of Shlomo Mordecai Grade, a Hebrew teacher and maskil (advocate of the Haskalah, the European Jewish Enlightenment), received a secular as well as Jewish religious education. He studied for several years with Reb Avrohom Yeshaya Karelitz, the Chazon Ish (1878–1953), one of observant Judaism's great Torah scholars. In 1932, Grade began publishing stories and poems in Yiddish, and in the early 1930s was among the founding members of the "Young Vilna" experimental group of artists and writers. He developed a reputation as one of the city's most articulate literary interpreters.

He fled the German invasion of Vilnius in World War II and sought refuge in the Soviet Union.  In the Holocaust he lost his wife Frumme-Liebe (daughter of the Rabbi of Glebokie) and his mother Vella Grade Rosenthal (daughter of Rabbi Rafael Blumenthal).  When the war ended, he lived briefly in Poland and France before relocating to the United States in 1948.

Grade's second wife, Inna (née Hecker), translated a number of his books into English; she died in New York City on May 2, 2010. 

Several books were also translated to Hebrew and published in Israel.

Works
Grade's postwar poetry is primarily concerned with Jewish survival in the wake of the Holocaust.

Grade's most highly acclaimed novels, The Agunah (1961, tr. 1974) and The Yeshiva  (2 vol., 1967–68, tr. 1976–7), deal with the philosophical and ethical dilemmas of Jewish life in prewar Lithuania, particularly dwelling on the Novardok Mussar movement. These two works were translated from the original Yiddish into English by Curt Leviant.

Grade's short story, "My Quarrel with Hersh Rasseyner," describes the chance meeting of a Holocaust survivor with an old friend from the mussar Yeshiva. The narrator has lost his faith, while the friend has continued to lead a pious and devoted religious life. The former friends debate the place of religion in the postmodern world. The character Hersh Rasseyner is based on Gershon Liebman, a friend of Grade's from yeshiva who built Navardok yeshivas all over France. Grade recounted that he had a short conversation with Liebman, and created this story on what he imagined Liebman would say to him if he had the words. The story has been made into a film, The Quarrel, and a play.

While less famous than Isaac Bashevis Singer or Sholem Aleichem, Chaim Grade is considered among the foremost stylists in Yiddish. His work is now hard to find in English.

Literary estate
His papers were very numerous and consumed much space of the apartment he shared with his wife Inna in the Amalgamated Housing Cooperative in the Northwest Bronx.  The public administrator of his papers, Bonnie Gould, made requests to several institutions, including Harvard University and the YIVO Institute for Jewish Research to assist in cataloging Grade's papers.  By the end of August 2010, the papers had been transferred to YIVO's offices, for sorting.

In 2013 the Public Administrator of Bronx County awarded the YIVO Institute and the National Library of Israel rights to the estate. In accordance with the terms of the agreement, the assets of the estate will be permanently housed at YIVO in New York City. Materials will be shared and made available to the National Library of Israel once its new building opens in Jerusalem in 2020. YIVO and the National Library of Israel have digitized the entire archive and made it accessible online.

Bibliography

Fiction
"Mayn krig mit Hersh Raseyner" ("My Quarrel With Hersh Rasseyner") 1951. Translated in A Treasury of Yiddish Stories Irving Howe and Eliezer Greenberg, eds. New York: Viking Press, 1954.
Der shulhoyf 1958. Includes Reb Nokhemel der Malve, Shrifrele, and Der brunem. Translated, The Well, Philadelphia: JPS, 1967.
Di agune 1961. Translated, The Agunah, New York: Twayne Publishers, 1974.  
Tsemakh Atlas [a name] (2 volumes) 1967-68. Translated, The Yeshiva, Indianapolis: Bobbs-Merrill, 1976-77. 
Di kloyz un di gas (The Kloyz and the Street) 1974. Translated, Rabbis and Wives, New York: Knopf, 1982.  (Republished as The Sacred and The Profane). Contains three short novellas: "The Rebbetzin", "Laybe-Layzar's Courtyard", and "The Oath". The fourth story, Zeydes un eyneklekh ("Grandfathers and Grandchildren"), was translated in Have I Got a Story for You: More Than a Century of Fiction from the Forward, New York: W.W. Norton, 2016. 
Der shtumer minyen (The Silent Minyan) 1976. Short stories. Untranslated. Excerpt translated as "The Abandoned Sanctuary" for Yiddish Book Center.
Memoir
Der mames shabosim, 1955. Translated, My Mother's Sabbath Days, New York: Knopf, 1986. . Portion republished in The Seven Little Lanes. New York: Bergen Belsen Memorial Press, 1972, which contains the texts “On strange soil,” “The seven lanes of the Vilna ghetto,” and the story “My quarrel with Hersh Rasseyner.”

Serialized stories published in Yiddish newspapers
Froyen fun geto (Women of the Ghetto) c. 1960's.  Published in Forverts.
Beys harov (The Rabbi's House) c. 1960's-70's. Published in Der Tog and Forverts.  Currently being translated, forthcoming from Knopf. 
Fun unter der erd (From Under the Earth) c. 1980-82.  Uncompleted serialized novel published in Forverts.

Poetry
Yo (Yes). 1935.
Musernikes (Musarists). 1939.
Doyres (Generations). 1945.  Contains poems in Yo and Musarnikes.
On the Ruins. 1947.
Pleytim (Refugees). 1947.
Farvoksene vegn (Overgrown Paths). 1947.
Der mames tsavoe (My Mother’s Will). 1949.
Shayn fun farloshene shtern (The Glow of Extinguished Stars). 1950. Translated in "The Golden Peacock: A Worldwide Treasury of Yiddish Poetry", Ed. Joseph Leftwich, 1961.
 
Der mentsh fun fayer (The Man of Fire). 1962.  Translated in "An Anthology of Modern Yiddish Poetry", Ed. Ruth Whitman, 1966.
Parchment Earth. 1968.
Af mayn veg tsu dir (On My Way to You). 1969.

Awards 

 1967: National Jewish Book Award for The Well
 1978: National Jewish Book Award for The Yeshiva

References

Further reading
Colby, Vineta (ed). World Authors, 1975-1980
Kerbel, Sorrel (ed). Jewish Writers of the Twentieth Century

External links
 
Grade among the writers' and painters' group "Jung Vilna"
Chaim Grade and Vilnius
English Translation of The Yeshiva available to read online
Complete works of Chaim Grade in Yiddish, digitized
 

Yiddish-language poets
20th-century poets
Writers from Vilnius
Soviet emigrants to the United States
Soviet Jews
1910 births
1982 deaths
Itzik Manger Prize recipients